The 2020 Nebraska Democratic presidential primary took place on May 12, 2020, as part of the Democratic Party primaries for the 2020 presidential election. The Nebraska primary was a semi-closed primary and awarded 33 delegates to the 2020 Democratic National Convention, of which 29 were pledged delegates allocated on the basis of the results of the primary, and was the only contest on that date.

Former vice president Joe Biden as the sole remaining Democratic candidate won nearly 77% of the vote and all 29 delegates, with senator Bernie Sanders getting an overall statewide result of around 14% and very narrowly missing out on winning a delegate in the 2nd congressional district, and senator Elizabeth Warren as one of only two other withdrawn candidates on the ballot receiving 6%. Nebraska was the first state in the Democratic primaries to hand all of its delegates to one candidate.

Procedure
While the Democratic Party of Nebraska previously had used caucuses as their nominating process, the party's central committee decided on December 8, 2018 to return to a primary system after the proposal had been "overwhelmingly" supported in a voice vote.

Voting started and ended simultaneously throughout the state, with polling places in the Central Time Zone open from 8:00 a.m. until 8:00 p.m. and those in the Mountain Time Zone open between 7:00 a.m. and 7:00 p.m. In the semi-closed primary, candidates had to meet a threshold of 15 percent at the congressional district or statewide level in order to be considered viable. The 29 pledged delegates to the 2020 Democratic National Convention were allocated proportionally on the basis of the results of the primary. Of these, between 4 and 9 were allocated to each of the state's 3 congressional districts and another 3 were allocated to party leaders and elected officials (PLEO delegates), in addition to 6 at-large delegates. Originally planned with 25 delegates, the final number included a 20% bonus of 4 additional delegates on the 17 district and 5 at-large delegates by the Democratic National Committee due to the May date, which belonged to Stage III on the primary timetable.

County conventions were subsequently held between May 17 and May 31, 2020 to elect delegates to the state convention, which was held between June 13 and June 14, 2020. The state convention voted on June 13, 2020 to designate all pledged national convention delegates. The delegation also included 4 unpledged PLEO delegates: 4 members of the Democratic National Committee.

Candidates
The following candidates were on the ballot in Nebraska:
Joe Biden
Tulsi Gabbard (withdrawn)
Bernie Sanders (withdrawn)
Elizabeth Warren (withdrawn)
Michael Bloomberg, Pete Buttigieg, Amy Klobuchar and Tom Steyer had also qualified but had withdrawn before the deadline on March 10 and were taken off the ballot.

Results

See also
 2020 Nebraska Republican presidential primary

References

External links
The Green Papers delegate allocation summary
Nebraska Democratic Party delegate selection plan

Nebraska Democratic
Democratic primary
2020